Physoderma maydis is a species of fungus in the family Physodermataceae. It is a pathogen of the maize, causing a disease known as brown spot of maize or brown spot of corn. This species was first labeled in 1910 in India, then again a year later in Illinois.

References 

Fungal plant pathogens and diseases
Blastocladiomycota